The 1938 Colgate Red Raiders football team was an American football team that represented Colgate University as an independent during the 1938 college football season. In its tenth season under head coach Andrew Kerr, the team compiled a 2–5 record and was outscored by a total of 63 to 39. Donald Wemple and John Lucy were the team captains. The team played no home games.

Schedule

References

Colgate
Colgate Raiders football seasons
Colgate Red Raiders football